Proxima Centauri is the fifth album by Norwegian black metal band Ancient.

Track listing 

"A Lurking Threat" 00:38 (Music: Aphazel)
"Proxima Centauri" 04:37 (Music: Aphazel / Lyrics: GroM)
"The Ancient Horadrim" 04:50 (Music: Aphazel, GroM / Lyrics: GroM)
"In the Abyss of the Cursed Souls" 06:00 (Music: GroM, Aphazel / Lyrics: Deadly Kristin)
"The Witch" 04:15 (Music & Lyrics: Jesus Christ!)
"Apophis" 02:58 (Music: Aphazel, GroM / Lyrics: Aphazel)
"Satan's Children" 05:31 (Music & Lyrics: Jesus Christ!)
"Beyond the Realms of Insanity" 6:46 (Music & Lyrics: Aphazel)
"Audrina, My Sweet" 02:46 (Music: Jesus Christ! / Lyrics: Scarelfina)
"On Blackest Wings" 03:16 (Music: Aphazel / Lyrics: Deadly Kristin)
"Eyes of the Dead" 04:00 (Music & Lyrics: Jesus Christ!)
"Incarnating the Malignant Deity" 09:32 (Music & Lyrics: Aphazel)

Credits 

Aphazel - lead vocals, guitars, keyboards, bass (12)
Jesus Christ! aka Luci - guitars, keyboards Carnygoat Music
GroM - drums, percussion, backing vocals (5, 7)
Deadly Kristin - vocals
Dhilorz - bass
Guest: Scarelfina - spoken words (9)
Produced by Ancient & Jacob Hansen
Engineered by Jacob Hansen.

Ancient (band) albums
2001 albums